Soyuz TM-32 was a crewed Soyuz spaceflight which was launched on April 28, 2001, and docked with the International Space Station two days later. It launched the crew of the visiting mission ISS EP-1, which included the first paying space tourist Dennis Tito, as well as two Russian cosmonauts. The Soyuz TM-32 remained docked to the station until October; during this time it served as the lifeboat for the crew of Expedition 2 and later for the crew of Expedition 3. In October it landed the crew of ISS EP-2, who had been launched by Soyuz TM-33.

Crew

Docking with ISS
Docked to ISS: April 30, 2001, 07:58 UTC (to nadir port of Zarya)
Undocked from ISS: October 19, 2001, 10:48 UTC (from nadir port of Zarya)
Docked to ISS: October 19, 2001, 11:04 UTC (to Pirs module)
Undocked from ISS: October 31, 2001, 01:38 UTC (from Pirs module)

Mission highlights
TM-32 carried a three-man crew (two Russians and one American, the latter not a professional astronaut) to the International Space Station, ISS. It docked automatically with the ISS at 07:57 UT on April 30, 2001, just a few hours after the space shuttle Endeavour on mission STS-100 undocked. The launched crew stayed for a week and returned in Soyuz TM-31, which had been docked to (or nearby) the station since November 2000 functioning as "lifeboat" for the onboard crew (Expedition 1 and 2).

As the new lifeboat for Expedition 2 and later Expedition 3, TM-32 stayed docked at the station for six months (except for a brief move between docking ports) and finally, on October 31, brought home two cosmonauts and an ESA astronaut who had arrived a week earlier in Soyuz TM-33.

External links

 NASA Soyuz-33/Soyuz-32 (return) Taxi Crew

Crewed Soyuz missions
Spacecraft launched in 2001
Orbital space tourism missions
Spacecraft which reentered in 2001
Spacecraft launched by Soyuz-U rockets
Dennis Tito